Muiris Ó Begléighinn (died 1528) was an Irish physician.

The Annals of Connacht, sub anno 1528, record his obit. 

Muiris son of Donnchad O Begleighinn, an eminent physician, died, with Unction and Penance.

The Annals of Loch Cé for the same year records Muiris, son of Donnchadh Ó Beigléighinn, an adept in medicine, who died this year.

The surname is now generally rendered as Beglan or Beglin.

See also

 Ó Begléighinn

References
 http://www.irishtimes.com/ancestor/surname/index.cfm?fuseaction=Go.&UserID=
 http://www.ucc.ie/celt/published/T100011/index.html

16th-century Irish medical doctors
People from County Longford
1528 deaths
Year of birth unknown